The carotid branch of the glossopharyngeal nerve (carotid sinus nerve or Hering's nerve) is a small branch of the glossopharyngeal nerve (cranial nerve IX) that innervates the carotid sinus, and carotid body.

Anatomy

Course and relations 
It runs downward anterior to the internal carotid artery. It communicates with the vagus nerve and sympathetic trunk before dividing in the angle of the bifurcation of the common carotid artery to innervate the carotid body, and carotid sinus.

Function 
It conveys information from the baroreceptors of the carotid sinus to the vasomotor center in the brainstem (in order to mediate blood pressure homeostasis), and from chemoreceptors of the carotid body (mainly conveying information about partial pressures of blood oxygen, and carbon dioxide).

References

External links
 
 

Glossopharyngeal nerve
Blood pressure